Lone Star Law is an American reality television series that debuted on June 2, 2016, on Animal Planet.

Set in Texas and similar to its network sister show North Woods Law, the show follows numerous game wardens of the Texas Parks and Wildlife Department from various regions of the Lone Star State.

The Intro, " A Texas Game Warden's Job", is spoken by Warden Randolph McGee.

Cast

Episodes

Series Overview

Season 1 (2016)

Season 2 (2017)

Season 3 (2018)

Season 4 (2018-19)

Season 5 (2019)

Season 6 (2019)

Season 7 (2020)

Season 8 (2020)

References

2010s American reality television series
2016 American television series debuts
American television spin-offs
English-language television shows
Animal Planet original programming
Television shows set in Texas
Law enforcement in Texas
2020s American reality television series
Reality television spin-offs